The 1977 St. Louis Cardinals season was the franchise’s 56th year with the National Football League and the 18th season in St. Louis. This was the final season in St Louis for head coach Don Coryell who began coaching the San Diego Chargers the following year. The Cardinals hosted the Miami Dolphins on Thanksgiving, replacing the Dallas Cowboys.

Coryell's final game with the Cardinals was an embarrassing 17–7 loss to the Tampa Bay Buccaneers, who won for the first time at Tampa Stadium following 13 consecutive home defeats. It was the Bucs' second consecutive victory following an NFL-record 26-game losing streak; Tampa Bay won 33–14 at New Orleans the previous week.

Offseason

NFL Draft

Personnel

Staff

Roster

Regular season 
On November 24, 1977, Dolphins quarterback Bob Griese would throw for six touchdown passes in a Thanksgiving Day match versus the Cardinals.  The Dolphins would set a franchise record for most points scored in one game with 55.  Of note, the Dolphins would score eight touchdowns and accumulate 34 first downs. This would end the experiment of the Cardinals playing on Thanksgiving, and the following season the Dallas Cowboys would go back in that holiday slot.

Schedule

Game Summaries

Week 5 
Place: Veterans Stadium, Philadelphia, Pennsylvania
Television: CBS 
Announcers: Gary Bender, Tom Matte
Jim Hart, questionable all week with an injury, passed 38 yards to Ike Harris for one td and Terry Metcalf and Jerry Latin scored on runs of 10 and two yards to lift the Cardinals to a much needed win over the Eagles.

Week 6 
Place: Busch Stadium, St. Louis, Missouri
Television: CBS
Announcers: Gary Bender, Tom Matte
Mel Gray caught passes from quarterback Jim Hart and running back Terry Metcalf for touchdowns and Wayne Morris scored four times on short distance runs in St. Louis Wide-open victory and now are back in the running for a playoff spot. Bobby Scott passed for two touchdowns for the Saints, who wiped out a 21-0 lead, then fell back again. The Saints total 440 yards on offense while the victorious Cardinals gained 494 yards.

Week 8 
Place: Metropolitan Stadium, Bloomington, Minnesota
Television: CBS
Announcers: Pat Summerall and Tom Brookshier
"I think we we're fortunate to catch them a little flat and we were at the top of our game" Don Coryell said after his Cardinals beat the front running Central Division leaders Vikings. The Cardinals rolled up 316 yards on the ground and Jim Hart completed 10 of 14 passes for 143 yards and two touchdowns. The short scoring passes to Wayne Morris and Terry Metcalf came in the first half. The two running backs each scored twice as the Cardinals piled up a 27-0 lead before Minnesota scored late in the third quarter with a 9-yard touchdown pass from Fran Tarkenton to Sammy White. Vikings coach Bud Grant said "The Cardinals offense is outstanding. We didn't think we could stop them but we did think we could outscore them. Had we scored a couple times when we were down there, it might have been a different game."

Standings

References 

 Cardinals on Pro Football Reference
 Cardinals on jt-sw.com

St. Louis
Arizona Cardinals seasons